Jack Hillson (born 1945) is a former Canadian provincial politician. He was the Liberal member of the Legislative Assembly of Saskatchewan for the constituency of North Battleford from 1996 to 2003.

Footnotes

Saskatchewan Liberal Party MLAs
Living people
1945 births
21st-century Canadian politicians